Carlo Barabino (February 11, 1768 – September 3, 1835) was a prominent Italian architect of the Neoclassic period, active mainly in his native Genoa. He was a pupil of Giuseppe Barbieri. He designed the original Teatro Carlo Felice Opera House in Genoa; facade rebuilt after destruction in World War II. He also built the Palazzo Dell'Accademia in Genoa, and the facade of Santa Maria Assunta, Genoa (Carignano).

Sources

Architects from Genoa
19th-century Italian architects
1768 births
1835 deaths
Italian neoclassical architects